East Croydon is a railway station and tram stop in Croydon, Greater London, England, and is located in Travelcard Zone 5. It is one of three railway stations in the London Borough of Croydon with Croydon in their name, the others being West Croydon and South Croydon. A Tramlink tram stop is located immediately outside the main station entrance.

The present station building opened on 19 August 1992. It consists of a large steel and glass frame suspended from a lightweight steel structure that straddles the track and platforms to a much greater extent than was possible with its Victorian predecessor. Four steel ladder masts anchor the glass box and the whole gives the impression of a suspension bridge that stretches into the distance. External canopies cover the entrances, a café's open-air seating area and the approaches to the tram stop. 440 m2 of glass were used in the roof and 800 m2 for the wall glazing.

It was announced in 2010 that Network Rail had proposed a £20m project to revamp the station with an additional entrance and a shortcut into the town centre. The new bridge was officially opened in December 2013. Disabled-accessible slopes to all platforms are provided and there is a footbridge connecting all platforms. There are refreshment stalls and vending machines in the seating areas on the platforms, and trolleys are available along with step-free access to buffets. There are electronic information displays showing departures to 80 stations.

History
The population of Croydon increased 14-fold (from 16,700 to 233,000) between the opening of the station in 1841 and 1921. As a result, the station has been enlarged and rebuilt on several occasions.

Opening
On 12 July 1841, the London & Brighton Railway (L&BR) began passenger services through Croydon station (now East Croydon) on the Brighton Line from London Bridge to Haywards Heath. The station was designed by the architect David Mocatta, the second station in the town since the London and Croydon Railway (L&CR) had opened its Croydon station (now West Croydon) in June 1839.

The station became jointly administered by the L&BR and the South Eastern Railway (SER) in 1842, who shared the Brighton Main Line as far as Redhill. Fares from Croydon to London were common to two railways. In 1846, the L&BR and the L&CR amalgamated to form the London, Brighton and South Coast Railway (LB&SCR), and the two stations were shortly renamed East Croydon and West Croydon to avoid confusion.

New Croydon
With the completion of the line to Victoria between 1860 and 1862, extra platforms were needed to provide a terminal for LB&SCR suburban services to and from the West End of London whilst London Bridge trains continued to use the existing lines. The new platforms adjoined East Croydon but were treated by the LB&SCR as a separate station named New Croydon, with its own ticket office, and which ran exclusively LBSCR services. This device enabled the railway to avoid breaking an agreement with the SER, whilst offering cheaper fares than the SER from the original station.

The terminal platforms at New Croydon proved difficult to operate, as there was limited space for locomotives to run around their trains. As a result, in 1863 the LB&SCR obtained Parliamentary authority to build a one-mile (1.6 km) extension to a new terminus at South Croydon, which provided the additional operating room.

Central Croydon
The line opened in 1868 but enjoyed little success and closed in 1871, only to reopen in 1886 under pressure from the council before finally closing in 1890. It was demolished and replaced by the town hall.

1894/95 rebuilding

By the late 1880s the station was again congested due to the growth of traffic on the main lines, the expansion of the suburban network in South London and the new line from Croydon to Oxted. As a result, the station was rebuilt and the tracks remodelled during 1894/5. At the same time the suburban lines were extended from South Croydon to Coulsdon North, where they joined the new Quarry line. In 1897–98, East Croydon and New Croydon were merged into a single station with the three island platforms that remain. The two stations kept separate booking accounts until the formation of the Southern Railway.

1958 incident 

On 4 July 1958, a passenger fell onto the running lines after attempting to leave his train on the wrong side. Station foreman Thomas Ashby saw that he was reaching for the live rail as he attempted to stand, and that an express train was approaching, and so jumped down onto the track and held the man down, safely, as the express passed. For his actions, Ashby was awarded the Order of Industrial Heroism, which was presented to him in the S.R.A. Club Hall at the station, on 7 October the same year.

1992 rebuilding
The present station building opened on 19 August 1992. It consists of a large steel and glass frame suspended from a lightweight steel structure that straddles the track and platforms to a much greater extent than was possible with its Victorian predecessor.

Four steel ladder masts anchor the glass box and the whole gives the impression of a suspension bridge that stretches into the distance. External canopies cover the entrances, a café's open-air seating area and the approaches to the tram stop. 440 m2 of glass were used in the roof and 800 m2 for the wall glazing. The architects were Alan Brookes Associates and the structural engineers YRM Anthony Hunt Associates.

2010 revamp plans

It was announced in 2010 that Network Rail had proposed a £20m project to revamp the station with an additional entrance and a shortcut into the town centre. In September 2010, Croydon Council pledged £6m towards the revamp, ensuring that a bridge was included in the plans. The new bridge was officially opened in December 2013, providing pedestrian transfer between platforms as well as a new entrance at the northern end of the platforms and a more direct link to the town centre. The new walkway may be accessed from the town centre on the west via Lansdowne Walk, but access from the Cherry Orchard Road on the east has not been built.

Services

Destinations
East Croydon serves destinations mainly in East Sussex, West Sussex, Surrey and Brighton & Hove, including Gatwick Airport, Horsham, Caterham, Tattenham Corner, Brighton, Reigate, Redhill, Hastings, Eastbourne, Bognor Regis, Portsmouth, Tonbridge and many suburban stations in South London.

Trains include Thameslink services to Brighton, Redhill, Bedford, Luton and London Luton Airport, which means that the station has direct services to two airports. They also serve stations in or near the City of London, including St Pancras International, Farringdon, City Thameslink and London Blackfriars.

Southeastern to London Charing Cross and  occasionally call at the station during periods of engineering work.

Platforms
National Rail platforms

There are six platforms in the National Rail stations in form of three islands numbered from the west to the east.

Platforms 1, 2, 4 are northbound platforms, with 1 and 2 on the fast line and 4 on the slow line, while platforms 3, 5, 6 are southbound platforms, with 3 on the fast line and 5 and 6 on the slow line.

Tramlink platforms

There are 3 Tram platforms. Platform 1 is used for trams towards Elmers End, Beckenham Junction and New Addington. Platform 2 is not used although some trams may stop at this platform, mainly is used for trams which are on diversion and terminate at East Croydon occasionally. Platform 3 is used for trams towards Wimbledon and West Croydon(loop).

Former services
Services from London Bridge to Tunbridge Wells via Redhill were operated by Southeastern until December 2008, when they were transferred to Southern and curtailed at Tonbridge. In 2018, Southern withdrew the Victoria to Tonbridge via Redhill service, instead opting to run an hourly shuttle between Redhill and Tonbridge.

CrossCountry services stopped at East Croydon on the route to Brighton and Newcastle, until they were withdrawn in December 2008 (after the franchise passed from Virgin to Arriva)

Southern services to London Charing Cross were withdrawn in December 2009.

Current services

Southern

The typical off-peak service in trains per hour as of December 2022 is:
 2 tph to  via 
 2 tph to  via  
 2 tph to  via 

During the peak hours and on Saturdays, the services between London Victoria, East Grinstead and Littlehampton are increased to 2 tph.

Southern services at East Croydon are operated using  EMUs and  DMUs.

Thameslink
The typical off-peak service in trains per hour as of December 2022 is:
 4 tph to  via 
 2 tph to 
 2 tph to 
 4 tph to 
 2 tph to Three Bridges via 
 2 tph to  via Redhill

Thameslink services at East Croydon are operated using  EMUs.

London Trams
The typical off-peak service in trams per hour is:
12tph to 
8tph to 
6tph to 
6tph to 
8tph to New Addington
Tramlink services at East Croydon are operated using Bombardier CR4000 and Stadler Variobahn Trams.

Facilities

The main entrance is from George Street. Another entrance is next to the taxi rank on Billinton Hill just off Cherry Orchard Road, on the east side. There are several shops within the main building.

After the new bridge was opened in 2013 (see 2010 revamp plans, above) a further entrance became available with a walkway leading to the junction of Lansdowne Road and Dingwall Road.

The ticket office and the ticket machines usually become busy during peak hours. Disabled-accessible slopes to all platforms are provided and there is a footbridge connecting all platforms. There are three waiting rooms on the platforms with standard metal seats. There are refreshment stalls and vending machines in the seating areas on the platforms. Trolleys are available along with step-free access to buffets.

Oyster Pay as you go (PAYG) and contactless payments are accepted on journeys within London Travelcard zones.

There are electronic information displays showing departures to 80 stations.

Future

Station expansion

Several plans for station expansion have been put forward; none of which were confirmed to be happening by January 2015.

As part of the Croydon Vision 2020 regeneration scheme, East Croydon is expected be expanded to both the west and the east. Work has been planned on the west side for some time to increase station capacity, made more urgent by likely additional traffic from the planned Croydon Gateway nearby. A proposal by Arrowcroft, which included the 12,500-seat Croydon Arena, was rejected in August 2008. Arrowcroft had proposed a £24 million expansion of the station with a new 'airport style' concourse above the tracks to the north of the station. Arrowcroft had agreed to contribute £500,000 to the build costs to offset the impact of their proposed Arena. The source of the remaining £23.5 million was not identified, and Network Rail had not committed this expenditure in its capital plans.

The alternative scheme called Ruskin Square, by the owners of the site Stanhope Schroders, includes a planned contribution of £1.1 million for station capacity improvements that could be quickly implemented and integrated into their planned scheme for a new urban park, a rebuilt Warehouse Theatre, a doctors' surgery, housing (50% "affordable") and modern offices on the Croydon Gateway site.

To the east, towards Cherry Orchard Road, the proposed towers result in an extension to the station. The architect is Make with the client Menta, engineer Knight Frank and GL Hearn. Originally this project was planned to start in 2009, but this has been put back to 2019 with the planned completion date in 2023. The mixed-use scheme is for approximately 93,000 sq m (1 million sq ft) of accommodation in a series of crystalline towers. Some 70% of the area is planned to be residential accommodation, with the remaining 30% mixed commercial use, including offices and retail. Critical to all proposals are improvements to transport interchange. No project has yet delivered the necessary funds for significant enhancements.

In 2020, Network Rail revealed a proposal to move the station 100m north as part of a redevelopment of the nearby Selhurst Triangle junction, with the aim of increasing capacity and improving reliability. The rebuilt station would have two more platforms than today's station. The project is currently unfunded but if it goes ahead it is hoped that the redeveloped station and junction would be complete by 2033.

Renaming proposal
In late 2014 plans were made to rename the station "Croydon Central".

Proposed rezoning
East Croydon station is currently located in Travelcard Zone 5, but there is an ongoing campaign for East Croydon and the smaller West Croydon station (also located in Zone 5) to be rezoned to Travelcard Zone 4. It has been argued that the stations should be in Zone 4 because some stations currently in Zone 4 are further away from Central London, and that rezoning the stations will save commuters living in Croydon large amounts of money, attract investment to Croydon, create jobs in the town and make living in the area more attractive. It is expected that those commuting to Croydon would be largely unaffected by such a change. The issue has been debated in the House of Commons, but current train operator Southern has not formally submitted a proposal for such a change to Transport for London, which is required for a station to be rezoned.

Thameslink Programme

The Thameslink Programme (formerly Thameslink 2000) is a £5 billion major project to expand the Thameslink network from 51 to 172 stations spreading northwards to Bedford, Peterborough, Cambridge and King's Lynn. The project includes the lengthening of platforms, station remodelling, new railway infrastructure (e.g. viaducts and tunnels) and new rolling stock.

Selhurst Depot
There is a large railway depot for Southern and Thameslink trains to the north at Selhurst.

Transport connections

East Croydon is well served by both tram and bus, with a tram stop outside and a bus station close by. London Bus services reach Central London, Purley Way, Bromley, Lewisham and places to the south. Route X26, the longest London bus route, runs to Heathrow Airport via Sutton and Kingston.

Immediately outside the station is the Tramlink stop, with services to Elmers End, Beckenham Junction, New Addington and Wimbledon. A major interchange, East Croydon has three tram platforms, two on an island, the other backing on to the station entrance. Following problems with the points in this area, in August 2006 they were fixed to route all eastbound trams into Platform 1, the concourse-side platform. The island platform can be used only by westbound trams and by trams terminating from the east.

Crime
In January 2006 the London Assembly issued statistics of crime in main-line railway stations outside Zone 1. East Croydon, Clapham Junction and Walthamstow Central were the worst affected. Both councils and railway companies were blamed.

References

External links

East Croydon Tram Stop – Timetables and live departures at Transport for London
BBC News article on Croydon's trams
BBC News article on East Croydon's position in the top 10 stations

Tramlink stops in the London Borough of Croydon
Railway stations in the London Borough of Croydon
Former London, Brighton and South Coast Railway stations
Railway stations in Great Britain opened in 1841
Railway stations served by Govia Thameslink Railway
Railway stations in Great Britain opened in 1992
Croydon 2020
David Mocatta railway stations